Goodenia cycnopotamica is a plant in the Goodeniaceae family which is endemic to Australia, and found in both South Australia and Western Australia

It was first described as Velleia cycnopotamica by Ferdinand von Mueller in 1867, from a specimen collected by James Drummond on the banks of the Swan River.  in 2020, Kelly Anne Shepherd  and others transferred it to the genus, Goodenia based on  nuclear, chloroplast and mitochondrial data, and this is the name accepted by the Western Australian Herbarium, but other databases have not yet made this change.

Description
Goodenia cycnopotamica is an annual herb. The flower stalks are up to 25 cm long. Leaves oblong to oblanceolate, dentate to lyrate; lamina 2-6 cm long, 3-10 mm wide. The bracteoles are up to 15 mm long, and free. The sepals are free or nearly free, about 4 mm long, and are oblong to elliptic, and attached below the ovary. The pink, lilac to white corolla is 5 to 6 mm long, and hairy to almost smooth on the  outside, while the inside is sometimes glabrous and sometimes not. There are no projections. The ovary has about four ovules. The capsule is globular. The seeds are wrinkled and 3 to 4 mm in diameter, with a comma-shaped body and broad wings.

It flowers mainly from August to October.

References

cycnopotamica
Plants described in 1867
Taxa named by Ferdinand von Mueller